The men's eight was one of four rowing events on the Rowing at the 1908 Summer Olympics programme. Nations could enter up to two boats (total of 16 rowers and 2 coxswains). Six boats from five nations competed. The event was won by Leander Club, one of the two British boats. The silver medal went to the Belgian team from Royal Club Nautique de Gand. Bronze medals were awarded to the two semifinal losers; Argonaut Rowing Club of Canada had been defeated by Leander while Britain's second boat, from Cambridge University Boat Club, lost to the Belgians.

Background

This was the third appearance of the event. Rowing had been on the programme in 1896 but was cancelled due to bad weather. The men's eight has been held every time that rowing has been contested, beginning in 1900.

The top eight team in the world at the time was Belgium's Royal Club Nautique de Gand, winners of the European championship in 1906, 1907, and 1908 as well as the Henley Grand Challenge Cup in 1906 and 1907. Their primary challenger in London was the host nation's Leander Club, winners of the Grand Challenge Cup in 1903, 1904, and 1905. Significant absences were the American Vesper Boat Club, the two-time reigning Olympic champions, and Great Britain's Christ Church College Boat Club, the 1908 Grand Challenge Cup victors.

Great Britain, Hungary, and Norway each made their debut in the event. Belgium and Canada each made their second appearance, matching the absent United States for most among nations.

Starting list

The following boats and/or rowing clubs participated:

 Royal Club Nautique de Gand (colours: red, yellow and black; red and white oars)
 Argonaut Rowing Club (colours: light and dark blue)
 Cambridge University Boat Club (colours: light blue)
 Leander Club (colours: cerise)
 Pannónia Evezős Egylet/Magyar Evezős Szövetség (colours: red, white and green)
 Norges Roforbund (colours: red, white and blue)

Competition format

The "eight" event featured nine-person boats, with eight rowers and a coxswain. It was a sweep rowing event, with the rowers each having one oar (and thus each rowing on one side). The course was 1.5 miles in length, with two slight bends near the start and about halfway.

The 1908 tournament featured three rounds of one-on-one races; with 6 boats in the competition, 2 boats received byes into the semifinals and there were two races in the quarterfinal round. Semifinal losers each received bronze medals.

Schedule

Results

Quarterfinals

All heats were held on Wednesday, 29 July.

Quarterfinal 1

Quarterfinal 2

Semifinals

Both semifinals were held on Thursday, 30 July.

Semifinal 1

Semifinal 2

This race was the only rowing heat in which a British boat was defeated by a visiting nation. In each of the other three events, the two British boats won both semifinals.

Final

The final was held on Friday, 31 July.

Leander pulled away again, eventually winning by two lengths in a time of 7 min. 52 sec.

References

Sources
 
 

Men's coxed 8